The 2020–21 season was Hereford's sixth season since forming as a phoenix club after the demise of Hereford United in 2014. The club competed in the National League North for the third consecutive season following their 16th placed finish in the previous season.

As a result of the COVID-19 pandemic, on 18 February 2021 National League clubs voted to declare the season null and void. Hereford's final league position was 12th.

First-team squad 
 As of 22 May 2021

Transfers

Transfers in

Transfers out

Loans in

Loans out

Pre-season

Competitions

Overview

National League North

League table

Results summary

Matches

FA Cup 

Hereford entered the competition in the second qualifying round.

FA Trophy 

Hereford entered the competition in the second round.

Squad statistics

Goals

References 

Hereford F.C.